Neptun Werft is a German shipbuilding company, headquartered in Rostock. Since 1997 it has been part of the Meyer Neptun Group together with Meyer Werft in Papenburg.

History
The company was founded as the "Schiffswerft und Maschinenfabrik von Wilhelm Zeltz und Albrecht Tischbein" in 1850 and their first iron steamship was launched in 1851. The shipyard developed quickly, and as early as in 1857 it had some 400 employees. In 1890, after several mergers and buyouts, it became the "Actien-Gesellschaft Neptun". After 1945 and the division of Germany, the shipyard focused on markets in Eastern Europe. At that time the "Schiffswerft Neptun Rostock" counted among the most renowned state-owned shipyards of the German Democratic Republic.

The changing conditions of international competition following the German reunification brought about a time of change for the company. Productivity was not up to international standards, and due to EU restrictions it was no longer allowed to build new sea-going vessels. The yard became "Neptun Industrie Rostock" (NIR), and the following years were heavily influenced by staff cuts, re-organisation and diversification. Focus was put on the repair and upgrading of ships, construction and delivery of ship components, steel constructions for hydraulic engineering and complex Ro-Ro facilities.

In 1997 Neptun Werft became part of the Meyer Neptun Group, which includes Meyer Werft in Papenburg. Neptun Werft has geared its activities to its core maritime sector, while many companies formerly belonging to NIR and dealing in different sectors were sold, or set up independent operations. Since the year 2000 the shipyard's activities have been centred on the premises in Warnemünde (a district of Rostock), and the construction of river cruise vessels has been included in the product range. New production halls were erected in 2003 which allow ship construction independent of weather conditions.

Ships built by Neptun Werft (selection)

Civilian ships

Recent
 A'Rosa Bella (2002)
 A'Rosa Donna (2002)
 A'Rosa Mia (2003)
 A'Rosa Riva (2004)
 A'Rosa Luna (2005)
 A'Rosa Stella (2005)
 A'Rosa Aqua (2009)
 A'Rosa Viva (2010)
 A-Rosa Brava (2011)
 A-Rosa Silva (2012)
 A-Rosa Flora (2014)

Historic
 SS Denebola (1899)

Naval ships

Submarines (U-boats)
 10 x Type VII submarines (1941 - 1944)

References

External links
 Homepage of Neptun Werft

Shipbuilding companies of Germany
Companies established in 1850
Economy of Rostock
Companies based in Mecklenburg-Western Pomerania